Du rififi chez les femmes ("The Riff Raff Girls") is a French-Italian film directed by Alex Joffé and released in 1959.

Plot 
In Brussels, rival criminal gangs confront each other. One is led by Vicky, proprietor of a nightclub on a barge; the other by Bug, who wants to reign over the lucrative nightlife business. Vicky and her gang, who are planning a bank raid, are going to see their plans confounded by Bug. In effect, he is being manipulated by a police officer who forces him to help break up a drug trafficking deal in return for keeping his residence in Belgium. Bug and Yoko will strongly compromise the bank raid, believing that it is linked to the drugs.

Book 
The film is based on the Auguste Le Breton novel, Du rififi chez les femmes, published in 1957 and reprinted in 2010.

Production 
 Director: Alex Joffé
 Screenplay: Alex Joffé, José Giovanni, Gabriel Arout, James-Jacques Mage and Auguste Le Breton from his novel Du rififi chez les femmes (1957, Presses de la Cité)
 Dialogue: Auguste Le Breton
 Music: Louiguy
 Song: Rififi, words by Charles Aznavour and music by Louiguy, sung by Nadja Tiller
 Director of photography: Pierre Montazel
 Camera Operator: Alain Douarinou
 Sound: Joseph de Bretagne
 Editing: Léonide Azar
 Set Design: Rino Mondellini
 Costumes: Pierre Balmain
 Stills photographer: Walter Limot
 Country: France, Italy
 Filming:
 Language: French
 Interiors: Studios de Boulogne-Billancourt (Hauts-de-Seine)
 Exteriors: Brussels
 Producer: James-Jacques Mage
 Director of production: Jacques Plante
 Production companies: Les Productions de l'Étoile, Dismage, Transalpina, Technostampa
 Distribution company: Cinedis
 Aspect ratio: black and white — 35 mm — 1:37.1 — monaural
 Genre: Crime film
 Length: 110 min
 Release date: 20 May 1959

Cast 
 Nadja Tiller : Vicky
 Robert Hossein : Marcel Point-Bleu
 Silvia Monfort : Yoko
 Roger Hanin : Bug
 Pierre Blanchar : "Le Pirate"
 Françoise Rosay : Berthe
 Jean Gaven : James
 Eddie Constantine : Williams
 Georges Rigaud : "Le Marquis"
 Daniel Emilfork : Luigi
 Wayne Van Voorhes : Chicago, the Sicilian
 André Cellier : the transporter
 Denise Clair : Prune
 Michel Galabru
 Lucien Raimbourg
 Maurice Garrel
 Carlo Campanini
 Tiberio Murgia
 René Alone
 Isaac Alvarez
 Léopoldo Francès
 Liliane de Kermadec
 Claude Piéplu
 Anne-Marie Coffinet
 André Berthomieu
 Yves Barsacq

References

External links  
 

1959 crime films
French heist films
Films based on French novels
Films based on works by Auguste Le Breton
French black-and-white films
1959 films
French gangster films
Italian gangster films
Films with screenplays by José Giovanni
1950s heist films
1950s French-language films
1950s Italian films
1950s French films